The Highland Towers Apartments is an historic building which is located in the Shadyside neighborhood of Pittsburgh, Pennsylvania. Built in 1913, it was listed on the National Register of Historic Places in 1976.

History and architectural features
 This apartment building was designed by Pittsburgh native Frederick G. Scheibler Jr., who designed over a dozen buildings in the area. The U-shaped structure has four floors of apartments and a raised basement.

The façade is tapestry brick in yellow, bronze, tan and brown. Scheibler placed decorative tilework between the windows; his tilework was based on a fabric designed by Peter Behrens.

References

Residential buildings on the National Register of Historic Places in Pennsylvania
Art Deco architecture in Pennsylvania
Residential buildings completed in 1913
Pittsburgh History & Landmarks Foundation Historic Landmarks
Apartment buildings in Pittsburgh
1913 establishments in Pennsylvania
National Register of Historic Places in Pittsburgh